William Burnett Benton (April 1, 1900 – March 18, 1973) was an American senator from Connecticut (1949–1953) and publisher of the Encyclopædia Britannica (1943–1973).

Early life

Benton was born in Minneapolis, Minnesota. He was educated at Shattuck Military Academy, Faribault, Minnesota, and Carleton College in Northfield, Minnesota until 1918, at which point he matriculated at Yale University, where he contributed to campus humor magazine The Yale Record and was admitted to the Zeta Psi fraternity.

Advertising and civic life

He graduated in 1921 and began work for advertising agencies in New York City and Chicago until 1929, after which he co-founded Benton & Bowles with Chester Bowles in New York. He moved to Norwalk, Connecticut in 1932, and served as the part-time vice president of the University of Chicago from 1937 to 1945. In 1944, he had entered into unsuccessful negotiations with Walt Disney to make six to twelve educational films annually.

Public and elected office life

He was appointed Assistant Secretary of State for Public Affairs and held the position from August 31, 1945 to September 30, 1947, during which time he was active in organizing the United Nations. He was appointed to the United States Senate on 17 December 1949 by his old partner Chester Bowles (who had been elected Governor in 1948), and subsequently elected in the general election on 7 November 1950 as a Democrat to fill the vacancy caused by the resignation of Raymond E. Baldwin in December 1949 for the remainder of the term ending 3 January 1953.

In the November 1950 election, he defeated Republican party candidate Prescott Sheldon Bush, father of U.S. President George Herbert Walker Bush and grandfather of U.S. President George W. Bush. In 1951 he introduced a resolution to expel Joseph McCarthy from the Senate. Benton provided 30,000 words of testimony on Sept. 28, 1951 in support of Senate Resolution 187. Due to Benton's resolution and McCarthy's response, the Senate Rules committee investigated and criticized both of them but punished neither.

On television, when asked if he would take any action against Benton's reelection bid, McCarthy replied, "I think it will be unnecessary. Little Willie Benton, Connecticut's mental midget keeps on... it will be unnecessary for me or anyone else to do any campaigning against him. He's doing his campaigning against himself." Benton lost in the general election for the full term in 1952 to William A. Purtell. Benton's comeback bid failed in 1958 when, running against Bowles and Thomas Dodd he failed to win the Democratic nomination for the U.S. Senate. He was later appointed United States Ambassador to UNESCO in Paris and served from 1963 to 1968.

Benton served on the board of trustees of the University of Connecticut from 1957 to 1972. Converted to a museum in 1966, the William Benton Museum of Art on the university's main campus in Storrs was named in his honor in 1972. Benton had donated his personal collection of works by Reginald Marsh to the museum.

Encyclopædia Britannica and further civic life

For much of his life, from 1943 to his death in 1973, he was chairman of the board and publisher of the Encyclopædia Britannica, was a member of and delegate to numerous United Nations and international conferences and commissions, and trustee of several schools and colleges.  In 1943 Benton asked Mortimer J. Adler and Robert Hutchins to edit a set of great books to be published by Encyclopædia Britannica, Inc.; the 52-volume set of Great Books of the Western World was published in 1952.

Benton established the Benton Foundation. The William Benton Museum of Art is named in his honor.

He died in New York City on March 18, 1973, aged 72, and was survived by his widow, Helen Hemingway Benton, who died in 1974.

See also
Muzak, a company once owned by Benton

References

External links 
 William Benton's Congressional Biography
 
Guide to the William Benton Papers 1839-1973 at the University of Chicago Special Collections Research Center

Encyclopædia Britannica
1900 births
1973 deaths
American publishers (people)
20th-century American Episcopalians
Politicians from Minneapolis
Politicians from New York City
Politicians from Norwalk, Connecticut
Democratic Party United States senators from Connecticut
Permanent Delegates of the United States to UNESCO
The Yale Record alumni
University of Chicago people
Connecticut Democrats
McCarthyism
20th-century American writers
20th-century American businesspeople
20th-century American politicians
Businesspeople from Minneapolis
United States Assistant Secretaries of State